The Mohan Park, is an urban park in the city of Solan in Himachal Pradesh, India. Located near Chambaghat, the City Park was opened in 1980 as a recreational area and a green lung for the city's residents.

History 
Built by Mohan Meakins Breweries, near Chambaghat on the mall road in 1980, it has a terrace garden, rides, green area and circular path around periphery.

Attractions
The attraction of the park and surroundings:
 This park is popular among morning and evening walkers. 
 In winter months people come to have sunshine.
 Favourite spot for families as children have playing area.
 Group meeting for senior citizens due to sitting area and clean air.
 Place for yoga enthusiasts.
 A place to unwind and relax

Gallery

References 

Tourist attractions in Himachal Pradesh